Miss Dorothy Betsy Peters , (born 1930) is an indigenous Australian  community leader and artist.

Career
The following list of positions held and awards given is as shown on Peters' Member of the Order of Australia Media Note.

 Indigenous Affairs
    Chair, Victorian Aboriginal Remembrance Committee, since 2007.
    Board Member, Healesville and District Hospital, 1991-1994.
    Past Member, Aboriginal Advisory Committee, Yarra Valley Community Health Service.
    Founding Member, Gumeril Aboriginal Health Service.
    Past Chair, Aboriginal Education Consultative Committee, 1990s.
    Member, Aboriginal Advisory Committee, Yarra Ranges Shire Council.
    Founder, Yarra Valley Aboriginal Elders Association.
    Past Member, Healesville Police Liaison Committee.
    Past Member, Healesville Indigenous Arts Enterprise Co-operative.
 Healesville Indigenous Community Services Association
    Honorary Elder and Inaugural Life Member.
    Past Board Member.
    Founding Member, 2009. 
 Swinburne University of Technology
    Advisory Establishment Committee Member, Oonah Learning Centre and Balluk Yilam Learning Centre.
    Member of the Swinburne Wurreker Committee, and Australian Indigenous Consultative Assembly, 17 years.
 Community
    President, Healesville RSL Ladies Auxiliary, 2 years.
    Life Member, Healesville Tennis Club.
 Professional
    Artist (Weaver), Traditional Basket Coiling and Culture Workshops, 1970-2012.
    Aboriginal Educator, Healesville Primary School, 1980-1991, Lilydale Secondary College, and various organisations.
 Awards and recognition includes:
    Member, Victorian Aboriginal Honour Roll, since 2011.
    Member, Victorian Honour Roll of Women, since 2011.
    Red Ochre Award (outstanding senior female artist), Australia Council for the Arts, 2002, 'for her work in preserving and teaching the art of basket coiling in Victoria'.
    Elders Award, Eastern Metropolitan Region, NAIDOC, 2010, 1999.
    Centenary Medal, 2001.
    Meritorious Service, Department of Veterans Affairs, for establishing the annual Victorian Indigenous Veterans Remembrance Service at the Shrine of Remembrance.
    Yarra Ranges Shire Council, Lifetime Achievement Award

Personal
Dorothy ‘Dot’ Peters was born in Melbourne in 1930, the daughter of Vincent Peters and Daisy.

Honours and awards
 2002 Red Ochre Award
 2001 Centenary Medal for For outstanding community support to the indigenous community of Healesville
 2019 Member of the Order of Australia for For significant service to the Indigenous community of Victoria.

References

1930 births
Living people
Members of the Order of Australia
Recipients of the Centenary Medal